The 1847 Philadelphia mayoral election saw John Swift reelected to office for an eleventh overall non-consecutive term.

This was the last regularly-scheduled mayoral election in which the City Council selected the mayor, as all subsequent mayoral elections either reached a majority in the general election or used a different electoral system.

Electoral system
Beginning in 1839, the city operated under a mixed electoral system. Citizens voted for mayor in a general election. If a candidate receive a majority of the vote, they would be elected mayor. However, if no candidate received a majority, the City Council would select a mayor from the top-two finishers.

Results

General election

City Council (runoff)

References

1847
Philadelphia
Philadelphia mayoral
19th century in Philadelphia